The Rhode Island Public Transit Authority (RIPTA) provides public transportation, primarily buses, in the state of Rhode Island.  The main hub of the RIPTA system is Kennedy Plaza, a large bus terminal in downtown Providence, Rhode Island. In 2020 the authority served an average of 36,776 people a day, in 36 out of 39 Rhode Island communities.

History
RIPTA was created in 1964 by the Rhode Island General Assembly to supervise what had been previously a system of privately run bus and trolley systems. RIPTA began operating buses on July 1, 1966, inheriting services provided previously by the United Transit Company. Ridership had decreased in Rhode Island after the construction of the Interstate Highway System, and although it has never returned to 1940s levels, RIPTA's ridership has increased slightly over the years as services have been expanded and improved upon.

Routes
RIPTA operates services in several categories. All services are operated from two garages: in Providence at 265 Melrose Street and Middletown at 350 Coddington Highway.

Fixed route

Most of RIPTA's fixed-route bus lines are centered around three major hubs in the cities of Providence at Kennedy Plaza, Pawtucket at the Pawtucket Transit Center, and Newport at the Gateway Center. Two routes run between Providence and Newport, and four routes between Providence and Pawtucket. Three routes run between Providence and Warwick Mall, where they connect with a Coventry-Warwick Mall route and a Warwick crosstown route. A single circulator route is operated in Woonsocket; service was expanded in 2011 to allow residents—many of whom do not own cars—to reach shopping areas outside town.

In November 2019, RIPTA received $8 million in federal funding to add additional hubs at the Community College of Rhode Island in Warwick and the University of Rhode Island in Kingston.

R-Line
The R-Line is a limited-stop "Rapid Bus" route from Cranston to Pawtucket via Providence that combines the former 11 and 99 routes. The R-Line became operational on June 21, 2014. It has many BRT style elements, like unique branding and frequent, limited stop service and traffic signal priority but runs in mixed traffic and is therefore not BRT.

Downtown Transit Connector
The Downtown Transit Connector, or DTC is a transit emphasis corridor, from the Providence Station to the Hospital District. Routes 3, 4, 51, 54, 58, 62 (soon to be 66) and 72 run on this corridor providing 5 minute or better frequency on weekdays. There are stops at Kennedy Plaza, Dorrance Street, Ship Street and South Street. This corridor is BRT like, with limited stops, bus shelters with real-time information, frequent streamlined service, bus/bike lanes and traffic signal priority.

Trolley service
In 1999, RIPTA introduced its trolley service, providing service using tourist trolley style replica buses manufactured by Chance Coach & Optima Bus on two downtown Providence circulator lines going north and south of Kennedy Plaza and through the East Side Trolley Tunnel, and on a number of lines running through the Newport Gateway Center in Newport.

Demand response/Flex service

In addition to fixed route services, RIPTA also provides Flex Service service primarily settled around less-populated areas in the state, servicing the communities of Bristol, Burrillville, Coventry, Kingston (including the University of Rhode Island), Middletown, Narragansett, Newport, North Smithfield, Portsmouth, South Kingstown, Tiverton, West Warwick, Westerly, and Woonsocket.

Flex Service list

RIde is the demand-response service operated by RIPTA, providing primarily paratransit service throughout the service area of RIPTA. The vehicles used for both service are cutaway vans.

Fares

These are the current RIPTA fares.

Active fleet

Not included here are cutaway vans normally used on Flex service and RIde paratransit and demand response services. The entire fleet is ADA compliant. Except for buses 1001–1010 (trolley replicas), all buses feature bike racks.

List of Rhode Island Public Transit Authority routes
The Rhode Island Public Transit Authority (RIPTA) operates a number of bus routes in Rhode Island. Most are local bus routes based out of Providence; a number of local routes are also based from Newport, Pawtucket, or Woonsocket. The agency operates six express routes to park and ride lots around the state, and one local rapid bus route. The only Rhode Island towns not served by a RIPTA bus route are Foster, Little Compton, Charlestown and New Shoreham. Some rural towns, such as Glocester, Burrillville, Scituate, Richmond, West Greenwich and Tiverton, are only serviced by a single or limited-use line. While two routes run through Jamestown, neither operates on Sundays. The 1 Eddy/Hope/Benefit and 35 Rumford lines were the first two RIPTA routes with stops outside of Rhode Island's borders, as both routes end in a northern terminus at the South Attleboro MBTA station in Massachusetts. RIPTA was required to seek federal permission before the extending the routes across state lines to South Attleboro in 2013. Soon after, the 32 and 34 were extended over the Massachusetts border to Seekonk Square. In August 2019, RIPTA added a third line running to Massachusetts, the 24x, an express line which includes stops in Fall River and Somerset that connect to Southeastern Regional Transit Authority lines.

All routes serve at least one transit center or transfer point. Providence-based routes operate from Kennedy Plaza, Pawtucket-based routes operate or serve the Pawtucket Transit Center, Newport-based routes from Newport's Gateway Center, Woonsocket-based routes from Woonsocket Depot Square, Warwick based routes from CCRI's Warwick Campus, and local South County routes from URI's Kingston Campus. Some Providence routes continue through Kennedy Plaza to Providence Train Station or Hospital District as part of the Downtown Transit Connector.

Relationship with Project Weber/RENEW 
Project Weber/RENEW focuses much of their harm reduction outreach on the Rhode Island Public Transit Authority (RIPTA) bus terminal, Kennedy Plaza. Kennedy Plaza has one of the highest rates of overdoses in Providence. In 2022, RIPTA and Providence police were criticized by The Providence Journal for not carrying Narcan in Kennedy Plaza, despite the fact that The Providence Police Department has been trained and equipped to use Narcan since 2014. Dennis Bailer, overdose prevention program director at Project Weber/RENEW, has attempted to work with RIPTA to train and assist them to respond to overdoses which had led to little response from RIPTA. 

In 2021, Project Weber/RENEW successfully pushed RIPTA to reopen their Kennedy Plaza bathrooms so travelers could access basic sanitation in the height of the COVID-19 pandemic.

Notes
a.1335 has been retired due to a bus fire

References

External links

 RIPTA home page
 RIPTA Riders Advocacy Group

 
.
1964 establishments in Rhode Island
Bus transportation in Rhode Island
Government agencies established in 1964
Intermodal transportation authorities in Rhode Island
Public transportation in Rhode Island
Transit agencies in the United States
Transit authorities with natural gas buses